Mordellistena turkmenica is a species of monkey in the genus Mordellistena of the family Mordellidae. It was discovered in 2003.

References

External links
Coleoptera. BugGuide.

Beetles described in 2003
turkmenica